The women's 15 kilometre skiathlon cross-country skiing competition at the 2018 Winter Olympics was held on 10 February 2018 at 16:15 KST at the Alpensia Cross-Country Skiing Centre in Pyeongchang, South Korea. Charlotte Kalla of Sweden finished first to win the first gold medal of the 2018 Winter Games. The defending champion Marit Bjørgen finished second. For her, this was the eleventh Olympic medal, making her the most successful female cross-country skier. Krista Pärmäkoski took bronze.

Summary
The defending champion Marit Bjørgen, as well as the silver medalist Charlotte Kalla  and the bronze medalist Heidi Weng, participated in the event. After the exchange, a group of about a dozen athletes stayed ahead, and by 11 km only 9 left. Then Charlotte Kalla escaped, leaving behind Bjørgen, Krista Pärmäkoski, and Ebba Andersson chasing her. Kalla became the champion, with Bjørgen second, and Pärmäkoski third.

In the nighttime victory ceremony, the medals for the event were presented by Thomas Bach, president of the International Olympic Committee, accompanied by Roman Kumpost, FIS council member.

Qualification

A total of up to 310  cross-country skiers qualified across all eleven events. Athletes qualified for this event by having met the A qualification standard, which meant having 100 or less FIS Points in the distance classification. The Points list takes into average the best results of athletes per discipline during the qualification period (1 July 2016 to 21 January 2018). Countries received additional quotas by having athletes ranked in the top 30 of the FIS Olympics Points list (two per gender maximum, overall across all events). Countries also received an additional quota (one per gender maximum) if an athlete was ranked in the top 300 of the FIS Olympics Points list. After the distribution of B standard quotas, the remaining quotas were distributed using the Olympic FIS Points list, with each athlete only counting once for qualification purposes. A country could only enter a maximum of four athletes for the event.

Competition schedule
All times are (UTC+9).

Results
The race was started at 16:15.

References

Women's cross-country skiing at the 2018 Winter Olympics
Women's pursuit cross-country skiing at the Winter Olympics